Dee Ferris (born 1973 in Paulton, Somerset), is a British painter. She studied at Christ's College, Cambridge, and the Royal College of Art.

Ferris has participated in group exhibitions at Saatchi Gallery, London; Taka Ishii Gallery, Tokyo; Tate Britain, London; City Gallery Prague, Prague; Prague Biennale, Prague; Andrea Rosen Gallery, New York; and the Royal Academy. She has had solo shows at Taro Nasu Gallery, Tokyo and Corvi-Mora, London.

Her works are held in the UBS art collection in London and the Saatchi Gallery.

Selected bibliography
 Martin Coomer, "Ein Ding Schönheit ist ein Glück auf immer", Time Out, November 23–30, p. 44 (2005)
 Roy Exley, "Dee Ferris", Flash Art, November - December, p. 72 (2004)
 JJ Charlesworth, "Fever", Flash Art, November - December, pp. 84–87 (2004)
 Matt Price, "Mixed Paint", Flash Art, November - December, p. 91 (2004)
 Dan Smith, "Dee Ferris", Art Review, November, p. 143 (2004)
 JJ Charlesworth, "on art's permissive society", Modern Painters, Autumn, pp. 74–76 (2004)
 JJ Charlesworth, "I Want! I Want!", Art Monthly, October, pp. 33–35 (2003)
 Rose Aidin, "Dogs and Doigs", Art News, Summer, p. 128 (2003)
 Michael Wilson, "Exploring Landscape: Eight Views from Britain", Art Monthly, March, pp. 32–34 (2003)
 Martha Schwendener, "Critics Picks", Artforum, February (2003)

References

1973 births
Living people
20th-century English painters
20th-century English women artists
21st-century English painters
21st-century English women artists
Alumni of Christ's College, Cambridge
Artists from Somerset
English contemporary artists
British contemporary painters
English women painters
People from Paulton